Jeevan Lata is a 1936 Hindi social drama film directed by Sarvottam Badami. The film was produced by Sagar Movietone and had music by Pransukh M. Nayak. Sabita Devi and Motilal paired in several films right from Motilal's first Shaher Ka Jadoo (1934), with Badami using the pair for many of the films he directed for Sagar Movietone. This was Motilal's fourth film. The film starred Sabita Devi, Motilal, Gulzar, Sankatha Prasad, Bhudo Advani and Mehdi Raza.

Cast
 Motilal
 Sabita Devi
 Bhudo Advani
 Sushila
 Pande
 Sankatha
 Mehdi Raja

Music
The music was composed by Pransukh Nayak.

Soundtrack

References

External links

1936 films
1930s Hindi-language films
Indian black-and-white films
Indian drama films
1936 drama films
Films directed by Sarvottam Badami
Hindi-language drama films